George Dyer Weaver (16 September 1908 – 7 May 1986) was a Liberal party member of the House of Commons of Canada. Born in Prince Albert, Saskatchewan, he was a metallurgical engineer by career.

Weaver was born in Prince Albert, Saskatchewan. He trained for his engineering career at the Royal Military College of Canada, then served in South Africa's army between 1942 and 1944. From there, he joined the Royal Canadian Corps of Signals until October 1945, serving as a lieutenant.

He was first elected to Parliament at the Churchill riding in the 1949 general election after an unsuccessful campaign there in 1945. Weaver was re-elected for successive terms in 1949 and 1953 then defeated in the 1957 election by Robert Simpson of the Progressive Conservative party.

Weaver died on 7 May 1986 and is buried in Melfort, Saskatchewan at Mount Pleasant Cemetery.

Electoral history

References

External links
 
 Mary Tillie Weaver's obituary

1908 births
1986 deaths
Members of the House of Commons of Canada from Manitoba
Liberal Party of Canada MPs
Politicians from Prince Albert, Saskatchewan
20th-century Canadian engineers
Canadian military personnel of World War II
Royal Military College of Canada alumni